CNBC TV18 is an Indian pay television business and financial news channel owned by NBCUniversal and TV18.

CNBC TV18 Prime HD 
Having launched on 26 October 2011, this is CNBC TV18's premium service and the first business channel in India to have a HD channel. It features business news and stock market updates around the clock, and it is presented by Jude Sannith, an Indian journalist.

References

External links 
 

CNBC-TV18
Mass media in Mumbai
Television stations in Mumbai
CNBC Awaaz
CNBC global channels
Network18 Group
24-hour television news channels in India
Business-related television channels in India
Business-related television channels
Television channels and stations established in 2006